The First National Bank is a historic bank building located at Terre Haute, Vigo County, Indiana. It was built in 1892 and remodeled in 1928, and is a two-story, Classical Revival style limestone building.  It features a central pedimented pavilion supported by Corinthian order columns.

It was listed on the National Register of Historic Places in 1992.

References

Bank buildings on the National Register of Historic Places in Indiana
Neoclassical architecture in Indiana
Commercial buildings completed in 1892
Buildings and structures in Terre Haute, Indiana
National Register of Historic Places in Terre Haute, Indiana
1892 establishments in Indiana